Annibale Fontana (1540–1587) was an Italian sculptor, medallist and crystal-worker.

Fontana was born in Milan. His first known work is a crystal case, now in the Schatzkammer  of Munich, for Albert V of Bavaria (c. 1560-1570). In 1570–1572 he was in Palermo, working for viceroy Francesco Fernardo d'Avalos, of whom he made a portrait on a medal. He returned to Lombardy, where he married Ippolita Saracchi, a member of a famous family of crystal-workers.

Later Fontana worked in the church of Santa Maria presso San Celso, executing the famous statue of the Assumption and numerous statues for the façade and the cross and large bronze candlesticks of the major wing of the Certosa di Pavia.

He died in Milan in 1587.

References

1540 births
1587 deaths
Artists from Milan
16th-century Italian sculptors
Italian male sculptors
Italian medallists
16th-century medallists